Roy Lee (born March 23, 1969) is an American film producer. Lee's production company, Vertigo Entertainment, has a first-look deal with Warner Bros.

Early life
Lee was born in 1969 at Wyckoff Heights Hospital, in Brooklyn, New York, to Korean parents. His father, a doctor, and his mother, had been in America for just three years and were still acclimating. Lee's mother, a devout Christian, nurtured hopes that he would become a minister.

During his undergraduate studies at George Washington University, Lee interned at the law firm Fried, Frank, Harris, Shriver & Jacobson. After graduating GWU, Lee attended law school at American University Washington College of Law where he prepared for a career in corporate law.

Career
In 1996, after graduating law school at American University and working at Fried Frank for eight months, he moved to Los Angeles and worked as a "tracker" at a production company called Alphaville. Trackers monitor spec material and dealmaking. At the time, trackers shared information over the phone, constantly updating each other in an endless cycle of calls.

Online tracking
One of Lee's "tracker" friends, Polly Cohen Johnsen, had been updating the story department at Jersey Films and had the idea to put their tracking group online. Lee joined forces with Johnsen and Glenn Gregory of Propaganda Films to convert their daily phone calls into an online tracking group. In 1997 Lee set up an Internet bulletin board called Tracker for twenty of his friends, who rated scripts and posted pertinent tracker information for each.

Within six months, Lee had established twenty-five online groups for other trackers at production companies and studios in Hollywood. Since he was the only member who belonged to every group, he had the best information. Lee's project changed the spec script market forever.  While spec scripts and pitches continued to sell, weaker material was dismissed more quickly, often within a single day, to the frustration of many agents. Online tracking accelerated the market, brought more honesty, allowed development execs to sift for material more effectively and put more pressure on agents and producers to represent better material.

In 1999, Lee went to work with BenderSpink, a talent-management company owned by two of his friends, Chris Bender and JC Spink. He was charged with finding Internet content: short films that would play on personal computers.  In this same year, Ed Kashiba, Sean Connolly and Lee developed the company Scriptshark.com, an online method for novice screenwriters to have their scripts assessed and potentially marketed.  Scriptshark eventually sold to The New York Times and closed in 2016.

Vertigo Entertainment

In the fall of 2001, after setting up film projects at all the major studios, Lee left BenderSpink and joined Doug Davison to create Vertigo Entertainment. When working on a project together, Lee did the selling and Davison handled the follow-up work. Lee noted that in the beginning, the hardest thing was making contacts abroad.

Lee's approach to making deals involved explaining to Asian distributors that their films would probably not sell in America because of their subtitles and that they would make more money by selling remake rights. Then he assured the rights holder that he would protect them by representing them for free (the American studio would pay his fee when the film was made). Once Lee had secured the right to negotiate for an Asian company, he told the studios to regard the film as a script that someone had taken the trouble to film, and that had been tested and proved a hit in its home country.

Lee earned his first motion picture producing credit on Gore Verbinski's 2002 blockbuster The Ring. He went on to produce the 2004 haunted house horror film The Grudge, which starred Sarah Michelle Gellar and was based on the 2002 Japanese film Ju-on: The Grudge, which was directed by Takashi Shimizu. The box office hit held the record for biggest horror opening weekend following its October 2004 release.

The Grudge 2 was released in October 2006, starring Amber Tamblyn and Gellar, and directed by Shimizu. It topped the box office at $22 million on its opening weekend. Also in October 2006, The Departed, a crime thriller from Warner Bros., directed by Martin Scorsese and starring Leonardo DiCaprio, Matt Damon and Jack Nicholson, was released, grossing $27 million in its opening weekend. It was Scorsese's biggest opening ever. The Departed later went on to win Best Picture at the 79th Academy Awards.

He worked as executive producer of the Uruguay short film Ataque de pánico! alongside Doug Davison.

Filmography

References

External links

 Roy Lee Interview

1969 births
Living people
American film producers
American film production company founders
American people of Korean descent
Film producers from New York (state)
George Washington University alumni
People from Brooklyn
Washington College of Law alumni
People associated with Fried, Frank, Harris, Shriver & Jacobson
Vertigo Entertainment